Comme on a dit is the second album by French rock band Louise Attaque. 
Although darker and consequently less radio friendly than the debut album, the album sold 700.000 copies in France.

Track listing
"Qu'est ce qui nous tente?" - 2:44
"Tu dis rien" - 2:22
"Sans filet" - 4:23
"D'amour en amour" - 1:20
"Tout passe" - 2:22
"L'Intranquillité" - 3:47
"Comme on a dit" - 4:51
"Pour un oui, pour un non" - 2:12
"Faut se le dire" - 2:33
"La plume" - 3:56
"Justement" - 2:40
"La ballade de basse" - 8:17
"Du nord au sud" - 4:57

Charts

Weekly charts

Year-end charts

Certifications

References

2000 albums
Louise Attaque albums